Beinn Bhuidhe is a mountain near the head of Loch Fyne in Argyll in the Scottish Highlands.

Overview
Beinn Bhuidhe is a  Munro that lies separately from the main body of the Arrochar Alps.  It is remote and unfrequented, situated to the north of the head of Loch Fyne between the upper reaches of Glen Fyne and Glen Shira.  It is the only high hill in an extensive tract of featureless moorland between the head of Loch Lomond and Loch Awe. Its long summit ridge has three tops, the summit being the south-western one.  Beinn Bhuidhe is much quieter than the Arrochar Alps proper, due in part to the  walk-in along a private road before starting the climb.

Geography
Beinn Bhuidhe is large mountain with three ridges shaped like the prongs of a trident. The longest ridge is the most southerly of the three and extends to Clachan Hill. The shortest is the most northerly and runs to Beinn an t-Sidhein. The summit is located approximately midway along this ridge.

Ascents
There are roads in both Glen Fyne and Glen Shira but Beinn Bhuidhe is mostly accessed from the former.  There are good tracks giving access to the long south-west ridges, but the short and steep route running west-north-west from Inverchorachan House is the most popular.

References
Footnotes

Bibliography

Munros
Mountains and hills of the Southern Highlands
Marilyns of Scotland
Mountains and hills of Argyll and Bute